Rozet is an unincorporated community in Campbell County, Wyoming, United States.  Founded in the 1890s, it was likely named for local populations of wild roses.

Public education in the community of Rozet is provided by Campbell County School District #1.

References

External links

Unincorporated communities in Wyoming
Unincorporated communities in Campbell County, Wyoming